Mefu Jinja (売布神社 Mefu-jinja) is a Shinto shrine in Takarazuka, Hyōgo, Japan.

History
It is one of the shrines in the Engishiki, which was written in 8th century, and the official history of the shrine says that it was founded in 610.

Objects for Worship
The principal object of worship at this shrine are Taka Himeno Kami and Ameno Wakahikono Kami. The two gods are understood as a wife and husband.

Surroundings
The area around this shrine was ruled by the Mononobe clan, and it was originally a shrine to worship their ancestors.  
The entrance station to this shrine is the Mefu-jinja Station on the Hankyu Takarazuka Line.

Shinto shrines in Hyōgo Prefecture